Atthaya Thitikul (born 20 February 2003) is a Thai professional golfer who plays on the U.S.-based LPGA Tour and the Ladies European Tour. She is the youngest golfer ever to win a professional golf tournament at aged 14 years, 4 months and 19 days after winning the Ladies European Thailand Championship as an amateur on 9 July 2017. She was the number one ranked women's amateur golfer in the world for a total of 12 weeks, rising to the top on two occasions, the first time on 26 June 2019.

On 27 March 2022, Thitikul won for the first time on the LPGA Tour at the JTBC Classic. While still age 19 in September 2022, Thitikul had two wins on the professional LPGA Tour and four wins on the Ladies European Tour. 

On 31 October 2022, Thitikul became the number 1 ranked golfer in the  Women's World Golf Rankings, and was considered to be the fastest rising star in golf. On 10 November, she was named the 2022 LPGA Tour Rookie of the Year.

Early life
Thitikul was born on 20 February 2003 in Ban Pong, Ratchaburi to Montree Thitikul and Siriwan. She first started playing golf at the age of 6 years old, when her father presented the opportunity to play golf or tennis. She chose golf after watching pictures of both sports on YouTube. She graduated from Sarasas Witaed Nakhonpathom School, a high school in Nakhon Pathom. She is also known by her nickname, "Jeen" or "Jeeno".

Amateur career

2017
On 23 February, 3 days after her 14th birthday, Thitikul made her first appearance at the Honda LPGA Thailand on the LPGA Tour, where she finished 37th out of the 66 competitors. She had earned her place in the field when she finished runner-up in the Thailand Amateur Open the previous August when she was just 13 years and 6 months old. After competing in the LPGA event, she won the Taiwan Amateur Open in June.

Her emergence onto the international golf scene came with her victory at Ladies European Thailand Championship on the Ladies European Tour as an amateur on 9 July. This win made her became the youngest person ever to win a professional golf tour event at age 14 years, 4 months and 19 days old. The previous record belonged to Canadian Brooke Henderson who won the 2012 Canadian Women's Tour aged 14 years, 9 months, and 3 days. Her amateur status meant that she could not claim the first prize of 45,000 euros for winning but it gave her the entries into both the Women's British Open and the Evian Championship in France. She missed the cut at the British Open by a shot but made the cut at the Evian Championship, playing the final two rounds and finishing in 64th place.

Thitikul also competed at the Junior Dutch Open in July. In the final round, she carded a course-record 8-under-par round to win the tournament by eight clear shots. In August, she won an individual gold medal and was part of the Thailand team that won another gold in the team event at the Southeast Asian Games in Malaysia.

2018
In February, Thitikul competed in the Women's Amateur Asia-Pacific Championship in Singapore, just as she turned 15. She was part of a four-way tie in the final round but went onto to win the title. Her victory earned her a place in the HSBC Women's Champions on the same course, plus entries into the ANA Inspiration at Mission Hills, California and for a place in the British Open, for a second year running.

At the HSBC event, she was the joint youngest starter of the championship at 15 years and 9 months, the exact same age at which Singapore's Amanda Tan competed in 2014. She carded a bogey-free final round of six-under par 66 to finish tied for eighth. At the ANA Inspiration in March, she finished in a tie for 30th place and earned low amateur honours.

In August, she was the only amateur to make the cut at the Woman's British Open and won the Smyth Salver, low amateur award. On 15 September, she broke the course record at World Junior Girls Championship on Camelot Golf and Country Club in Ottawa, with a score of 12-under-par 60, in the final round to win a title by 2 strokes.

At the 2018 Summer Youth Olympics in Buenos Aires, Thitikul teamed with Vanchai Luangnitikul to win the mixed team gold medal for Thailand.

2019
On 24 June, Thitikul won the Ladies European Thailand Championship for the second time in three years. She finished with a five-under-par 67 to win by five shots from Esther Henseleit. Following her win, Thitikul was ranked 1st in the world on the women's World Amateur Golf Ranking on 26 June and then again from October 2019 until January 2020 before turning professional. In August, she won the back-to-back Smyth Salver, low amateur honour, at the Women's British Open after finishing in a tie for 29th place at Woburn. In December, she represented Thailand at the 2019 Southeast Asian Games. She won a bronze medal in the women's team event.

Professional career

2020
Thitikul turned professional in January 2020 and played several events in Australia, including the Women’s NSW Open in which she finished fourth. After the COVID-19 break, she broke through for her first professional win in July at the Thai LPGA Tour's 3rd Singha-SAT Thai LPGA Championship. She finished the season with 5 Thai LPGA wins and was on the top of the money list.

2021
In May, Thitikul received a sponsor's exemption to play in the Honda LPGA Thailand on the LPGA Tour, in which she finished second, one stroke behind Ariya Jutanugarn. Later, she began playing on the Ladies European Tour.

On 27 June, Thitikul claimed her third Ladies European Tour title, her first as a professional, at the Tipsport Czech Ladies Open. This win made her eligible to play in European major tournaments, the Evian Championship and the British Open in 2021. On 12 July, she moved into the top 100 on the Women's World Golf Rankings for the first time with a rank of 89, after finishing second at the Aramco Team Series – London losing to Marianne Skarpnord in a playoff.

On 25 July, Thitikul recorded her best-ever finish at a major championship with fifth place at the 2021 Evian Championship, having a score of 14-under par 270, and boosting her world ranking to its highest ever position of 61st place. On 15 August, she achieved her seventh consecutive top-five place on a Ladies European Tour event by finishing tied for second in the Trust Golf Women's Scottish Open at Dumbarnie Links. Following the event, her world golf ranking moved to 35th place.

On 11 September, Thitikul secured her fourth Ladies European Tour title, her second of the season, at the VP Bank Swiss Ladies Open. She overcame a four-shot deficit after 36 holes to win by one stroke over Marianne Skarpnord. As a result, her world ranking rose to 28th place, her highest ever.

In November, Thitikul recorded three more top-ten finishes, including second place at the Aramco Saudi Ladies International, tied for sixth place at the Aramco Team Series – Jeddah, and third place at the season finale Andalucia Costa Del Sol Open De España. Her world ranking went into top-20 for the first time, rank 18.

Thitikul won the Ladies European Tour Order of Merit and Rookie of the Year titles, following her two wins, three runner-ups, and nine additional top-ten finishes. She became the fourth player to win both awards in the same season and also became the youngest Order of Merit winner. She was also selected to earn the Players’ Player of the Year title.

In December, Thitikul earned her card for the 2022 LPGA Tour after finished third at the qualifying school.

2022
After her tie for fourth-place finish at the HSBC Women's World Championship tournament in Singapore on 6 March, her world rank rose six places from 20th to 14th, the highest in her career, two weeks after her 19th birthday. She won her largest tournament purse in her first year as a professional on the LPGA, $81,447.

On 27 March, Thitikul won her first LPGA Tour tournament in her fifth start as a tour member at the JTBC Classic. She carded an 8-under-par 64 in the final round to come back from 6 shots behind after 54 holes to force a playoff, then beating Nanna Koerstz Madsen on the second playoff hole. She earned the $225,000 first prize, and became the youngest winner on the tour, aged 19 years and 35 days,  since Brooke Henderson won the 2016 Portland Classic at age 18 years, 9 months, and 23 days.

On 24 September, she tied the tournament record of 61 in the second round of the Walmart NW Arkansas Championship, placing her with a one-stroke lead going into the Sunday finale of the 54-hole tournament. The bogey-free, 10-under-par round started with a 32 on the back nine, followed by a 29 on the front nine, with an eagle-birdie-birdie finish. The 61 was her lowest LPGA score over her previous best round of 63, and her 36-hole total of 128 was lower than her previous total of 131. She won her second LPGA tournament the next day in a playoff win over Danielle Kang. Both of her LPGA wins were in a playoff.

By October, Thitikul had risen to second in the world rankings, and was described in 2022 as the fastest rising star in golf.

On 20 October, she set a tournament record of 63 (9-under-par) in the first round, leading the BMW Ladies Championship by one stroke, carding seven birdies and an eagle on the par-4 13th from 102 yards. Thitikul leads the Rookie of the Year race.

On 31 October, without playing in a tournament the previous week, she became the #1 golfer in the world for the first time, after her #2 ranking on 24 October. Ko Jin-young fell to #2 on her average points from 7.25 to 7.09, for Atthaya (7.20 to 7.13) to become the new #1.

On 10 November, she was named the Rookie of the Year.

She lost the top ranking spot to Nelly Korda on 14 November.

Amateur wins
2016 Singapore Junior Golf Championship qualifier, TGA-Singha Junior Ranking #6, TGA-Singha Junior Ranking #1, TGA-Singha Junior Ranking #3, TGA-Singha Junior Ranking #4, Singha Thailand Junior World Golf Championship qualifier, Singha Thailand Junior World Championships
2017 Taiwan Amateur Championship, Dutch International Junior Open, Southeast Asian Games (women's individual), Santi Cup, Pondok Indah International Junior Championship
2018 National Team Ranking #2, Women's Amateur Asia-Pacific, National Team Ranking #4, Queen Sirikit Cup, National Team Ranking #5, World Junior Girls Championship
2019 National Team Ranking #4, Thailand Ladies Amateur Open, National Team Ranking #5, World Junior Girls Championship

Source:

Professional wins (12)

LPGA Tour wins (2)

LPGA Tour playoff record (2–0)

Ladies European Tour wins (4)

 Thitikul won the event as an amateur.

Ladies European Tour playoff record (0–1)

Thai LPGA Tour wins (5) 
 2020 (5) 3rd Singha-SAT Thai LPGA Championship, 6th Singha-SAT Thai LPGA Championship, 7th Singha-SAT Thai LPGA Championship, 8th Singha-SAT Thai LPGA Championship, Muang Thai Insurance Thailand LPGA Masters

Other wins (1) 
 2021 (1) Phoenix Ladies Classic

Results in LPGA majors
Results not in chronological order before 2019 or in 2020.

LA = low amateur
CUT = missed the half-way cut
NT = no tournament
T = tied

Summary

Most consecutive cuts made – 11 (2017 Evian – 2022 British, current)
Longest streak of top-10s – 3 (2022 Women's PGA – 2022 British, current)

Ladies European Tour career summary

1 Insufficient rounds played to rank as Thitikul played in only one LET event in 2020
^ Official as of 2021 season

LPGA Tour career summary

a Competed as an amateur
n Not a member of the LPGA Tour
^ Official as of 5 March 2023

World ranking 
Position in Women's World Golf Rankings at the end of each calendar year.

^ As of 6 March 2023

Team appearances 
Patsy Hankins Trophy (representing Asia/Pacific): 2018 (winners)
Southeast Asian Games (representing Thailand): 2017 (winners), 2019
Youth Olympic Games (representing Thailand): 2018 (winners)
World Junior Girls Championship (representing Thailand): 2018, 2019
Asian Games (representing Thailand): 2018
Amata Friendship Cup (representing Thailand): 2018 (winners)
Queen Sirikit Cup (representing Thailand): 2016, 2017, 2018

References

External links

Atthaya Thitikul
Ladies European Tour golfers
LPGA Tour golfers
Golfers at the 2018 Summer Youth Olympics
Atthaya Thitikul
Atthaya Thitikul
Atthaya Thitikul
Southeast Asian Games medalists in golf
Competitors at the 2017 Southeast Asian Games
Competitors at the 2019 Southeast Asian Games
Golfers at the 2018 Asian Games
Atthaya Thitikul
Atthaya Thitikul
2003 births
Living people
Atthaya Thitikul